Li Keun-hak (born 7 July 1940) is a North Korean football goalkeeper who played for North Korea in the 1966 FIFA World Cup. He also played for Moranbong Sports Team.

References

1940 births
North Korean footballers
North Korea international footballers
Association football goalkeepers
Moranbong Sports Club players
1966 FIFA World Cup players
Living people